DD1 may refer to:
 DD National, an Indian national channel
 PRR DD1, Pennsylvania Railroad's class of electric locomotives